The Municipality of Grassland is a rural municipality (RM) in the Canadian province of Manitoba.

History

The RM was incorporated on January 1, 2015 via the amalgamation of the RMs of Cameron and Whitewater and the town of Hartney. It was formed as a requirement of The Municipal Amalgamations Act, which required that municipalities with a population less than 1,000 amalgamate with one or more neighbouring municipalities by 2015. The Government of Manitoba initiated these amalgamations in order for municipalities to meet the 1997 minimum population requirement of 1,000 to incorporate a municipality.

Communities 
 Elgin
 Hartney
 Grande-Clairière
 Lauder
 Minto

Demographics 

Attractions 
The Lauder Sand Hills (49°29′0″N, 100°39′56″W) are located 6 kilometres west of Hartney, were created between 10,000 and 8,000 years ago when the glaciers from the last ice age receded to the north. The glaciers left huge lakes in their wake and the lake that was responsible for the sand hills was named Glacial Lake Hind. The sand hills were formed by sand deposits left behind by a river delta going into the lake. When the lake eventually drained away, the Lauder Sand Hills were left behind. In 1971, the Lauder Sandhills Wildlife Management Area was established to protect the winter habitat of the white-tailed deer. The management area covers 3,145 hectares of land.

Lauder Sand Hills, Oak Lake, Oak Lake Marsh, Maple Lake, and Plum Lakes are all part of Important Bird Area (IBA) Canada called Oak Lake / Plum Lakes Area.

References 

2015 establishments in Manitoba
Manitoba municipal amalgamations, 2015
Populated places established in 2015
Rural municipalities in Manitoba